Hymenocallis puntagordensis the smallcup spiderlily or Punta Gorda spiderlily,  is a plant in the Amaryllidaceae. It is a rare and little known endemic known only from the vicinity of Punta Gorda, in Charlotte County, Florida. This is on the Gulf coast just north of Fort Myers. The species is listed as "critically imperiled."

Hymenocallis puntagordensis is a bulb-forming perennial found on roadsides and in disturbed pine woodlands. It is similar to H. latifolia, differing in having narrower, coriaceous leaves and a staminal corona with prominently lacerate margins.

References

puntagordensis
Endemic flora of Florida
Plants described in 1962
Flora without expected TNC conservation status